The Kuwait women's national ice hockey team is the ice hockey team representing Kuwait internationally in women's competition. The team is overseen by the Kuwait Ice Hockey Association, a member of the International Ice Hockey Federation (IIHF). The team was formed in 2017 and currently competes in the IIHF Women's Challenge Cup of Asia Division I tournament.

History
The Kuwait women's national ice hockey team played its first games in October and November 2017 at the Land of Smiles Ice Hockey Tournament in Bangkok, Thailand. Kuwait played four games at the tournament against club teams from Australia, Malaysia, the United Arab Emirates and the United States. They lost all four of their games and failed to record any goals. In May 2018 Kuwait took part in the Women's Gulf Ice Hockey Championships being held in Abu Dhabi, United Arab Emirates. Playing in five games against club teams from the United Arab Emirates Kuwait won three of their games and lost two. In October and November 2018 Kuwait took part in their second Land of Smiles Ice Hockey Tournament where they competed in four games against club teams from Indonesia, Thailand and the United Arab Emirates. They lost all four of their games and managed to record only one goal.

Kuwait made their debut in international competition in April 2019 at the 2019 IIHF Women's Challenge Cup of Asia Division I tournament in Abu Dhabi, United Arab Emirates. In their opening game of the tournament Kuwait lost 0–10 to the Philippines. Kuwait went on to lose their other two games of the tournament to India and the United Arab Emirates, finishing in last place with zero points. Their 0–13 loss to the United Arab Emirates is currently their biggest defeat in international competition. At the end of the tournament Ayah Alsarraf was named best goaltender by the IIHF Directorate and the coaches named Sarah Aldayouli as the best player of the team.

International competitions

IIHF Women's Challenge Cup of Asia
2019 IIHF Women's Challenge Cup of Asia Division I. Finish: 4th

IIHF Women's Development Cup

Players and personnel

Team roster
From the team's most recent tournament

Team staff
From the team's most recent tournament
Head coach: Meshal Alajmi
General manager: Khaled Almutairi
Team leader: Laila Alkhbaz
Equipment manager: Ramadan Abdelmeguid
Team staff: Maryam Alkhars

References

External links
Kuwait Ice Hockey Association

Ice hockey in Kuwait
Ice hockey
Women's national ice hockey teams in Asia